is a private university in Utsunomiya, Tochigi, Japan, established in 1989. The predecessor of the school, a women's junior college, was founded in 1967.

External links
 Official website 

Educational institutions established in 1967
Private universities and colleges in Japan
Universities and colleges in Tochigi Prefecture
1967 establishments in Japan